= Kampung Sungai Keling =

Village in Malaysia

Kampung Sungai Keling is a village in Federal Territory of Labuan, Malaysia.
